The following is a list of all team-to-team transactions that have occurred in the National Hockey League (NHL) during the 1945–46 NHL season. It lists which team each player has been traded to and for which player(s) or other consideration(s), if applicable.

Transactions 

Notes
 Getliffe replaced by Fern Gauthier on October 18, 1945 after Getliffe retired.

References

Transactions
National Hockey League transactions